Vágner Rogério Nunes (born 19 March 1973), known simply as Vágner, is a Brazilian retired footballer who played as a defensive midfielder.

The bulk of his professional career was spent in Spain, with Celta.

Club career
Born in Bauru, São Paulo, Vágner played professionally in his country for Lousano Paulista, União São João, Santos, Vasco da Gama, São Paulo and Atlético Mineiro, having already represented four clubs in ten years.

In 1997, he had an unsuccessful spell in Italy for Roma, eventually settling in Spain with Celta de Vigo. He played 23 games as the Galician team finished fourth in La Liga in 2003, but was relegated in the following year.

After his move to Atlético Mineiro, Vágner retired from football at the age of 32.

International career
Vágner represented Brazil at the 2001 FIFA Confederations Cup; his sole cap came as he played the first 45 minutes of the group stage win against Cameroon (2–0), in an eventual fourth-place finish.

References

External links
 
 
 
 
 

1973 births
Living people
Footballers from São Paulo (state)
Brazilian footballers
Association football midfielders
Campeonato Brasileiro Série A players
Paulista Futebol Clube players
União São João Esporte Clube players
Santos FC players
CR Vasco da Gama players
São Paulo FC players
Clube Atlético Mineiro players
Serie A players
A.S. Roma players
La Liga players
RC Celta de Vigo players
Brazil international footballers
Brazilian expatriate footballers
Expatriate footballers in Italy
Expatriate footballers in Spain
Brazilian expatriate sportspeople in Spain